In German, a Vorstadt is an area of a city that is outside the Altstadt (city center) but tightly connected to it and densely populated, thus distinguishing itself from a Vorort (suburb).

Historically, a Vorstadt ("suburb" in German) was a settlement outside the city walls, sometimes dedicated to specific trades. Later, large Vorstädte appeared in Gründerzeit era. Places named Vorstadt include Vorstadt (Königsberg) and Oranienburger Vorstadt.

Its French equivalent is faubourg, the Dutch equivalent is Voorstad, e.g. Voorstad St. Jacob in Roermond.

Vienna
In Vienna, the historical Vorstädte need to be distinguished from the Vororte. The Vorstädte were located outside the city walls, but within the Linienwall, a second ring of fortifications outside the city. The city walls were located in the place of the modern Ringstraße, while the Linienwall has been removed to give way for the Gürtel (both being rings of streets around the central city). The Vorstädte therefore correspond to the so-called "inner districts" of Vienna (2nd to 9th and 20th districts).

German words and phrases
Urban studies and planning terminology
Geography of Vienna